Ramirezia is a genus of sea anemones of the family Acontiophoridae. It currently includes only one species.

Species 
The following species are recognized:

Distribution
This species was described from Argentina.

References 

Acontiophoridae
Hexacorallia genera